Josée Lacasse (born 25 October 1965) is a Canadian former alpine skier who competed in the 1988 Winter Olympics. Winning multiple World Cup titles she was a force to be reckoned with. Now currently residing in the United States, she has two beautiful daughter Zoë (18) and Danika (16.) She continues to share her skills and knowledge for the sport, by coaching kids on the Diamond Peak Ski Team in Lake Tahoe.

Life 
She moved to the United States to attend Sierra Nevada College on a full scholarship (currently in their hall of fame). Josée Lacasse has two beautiful daughters and is now both a ski racing coach at Diamond Peak (ski area) and is currently working to become a nurse. Josee daughters are so very proud of their mother. Her oldest daughter Zoë (15) says, "My mother is my inspiration, she pushes me to my fullest potential and is my bestest friend, I couldn't ask for a better mother." Josée Lacasse is a very successful woman, who provides for her two amazing daughters, and still finds room to continuously pursue her dreams.

References

External links
 
 

1965 births
Living people
Canadian female alpine skiers
Olympic alpine skiers of Canada
Alpine skiers at the 1988 Winter Olympics
Universiade medalists in alpine skiing
Universiade gold medalists for Canada
Competitors at the 1991 Winter Universiade